Ian O'Halloran (born 12 April 1935) is a former  Australian rules footballer who played with Geelong in the Victorian Football League (VFL).

Notes

External links 

Living people
1935 births
Australian rules footballers from Victoria (Australia)
Geelong Football Club players
Ararat Football Club players